Boris Becker was the defending champion, but lost in the semifinals this year.

Ivan Lendl won the title, defeating Stefan Edberg 6–4, 7–6 in the final.

Seeds

Draw

Finals

Top half

Section 1

Section 2

Section 3

Section 4

External links
 Main draw

1987 Grand Prix (tennis)